The 1989 Banespa Open, also known as the Rio de Janeiro Open, was a men's tennis tournament played on indoor carpet courts in Rio de Janeiro, Brazil and was part of the 1989 Nabisco Grand Prix. It was the inaugural edition of the tournament and took place from 10 April through 16 April 1989. First-seeded Luiz Mattar won the singles title.

Finals

Singles

 Luiz Mattar defeated  Martín Jaite 6–4, 5–7, 6–4
 It was Mattar's 2nd singles title of the year and the 4th of his career.

Doubles

 Jorge Lozano /  Todd Witsken defeated  Patrick McEnroe /  Tim Wilkison 2–6, 6–4, 6–4
 It was Lozano's 1st title of the year and the 5th of his career. It was Witsken's 1st title of the year and the 5th of his career.

References

External links
 ITF tournament edition details

Rio de Janeiro Open
Rio de Janeiro Open
Rio de Janeiro Open
April 1989 sports events in South America